John Tait Robertson (25 February 1877 – 24 January 1935) was a Scottish football player and manager who played mainly as a left half. He won 16 caps for his country, scoring three goals.

Having started his career at Morton, Robertson moved to Everton of the English Football League in 1895, and then Southampton in 1898, with whom he won the Southern Football League in his only season. He then returned to his homeland with Rangers, where he won three consecutive league titles in his first three seasons. Robertson was the first player signed to Chelsea in 1905, and served as their player-manager in their first-ever season, in addition to scoring their first competitive goal. He finished his career in the same role at Glossop North End.

Playing career

Club
Robertson began his career at Morton, and moved to Everton in 1896. He spent a single season at Southampton in 1898–99, winning the Southern League. Following that, he returned to Scotland and won three consecutive Scottish Football League championships at Rangers in his first three seasons, plus a Scottish Cup in the fourth; his last of 178 appearances for the club in all competitions was a play-off for the 1904–05 Scottish Division One title, lost to Celtic.

In April 1905, Robertson was the first player to be signed by the newly-formed Chelsea Football Club for the role of manager, but continued to play as well (he was 28 years old at the time). It was Robertson who scored Chelsea's first competitive goal, in a 1–0 win at Blackpool on 9 September 1905. In his first season, he led the club to a third-place finish in the Second Division, one place off promotion. Robertson then surprisingly resigned from the club (third in the table at the time) on 27 November 1906. Chelsea were promoted to the top flight at the end of that season under caretaker secretary-manager William Lewis. Soon afterwards Robertson became player-manager of Glossop, where he remained until summer 1909, when he became reserve-team manager at Manchester United.

International
Robertson made his debut for Scotland on 2 April 1898 while at Everton, in a 3–1 home defeat to England in the Home Nations Championship. His second cap came on 8 April of the following year, while at Southampton. All of his 14 remaining caps came during his spell at Rangers.

He captained the Scots in his fourth match, as they beat England 4–1 at home on 7 April 1900. His first goal came in his sixth match, on 2 March 1901, in a 1–1 draw with Wales, again as captain. Robertson was Scotland's captain in five matches, and scored two more goals, both against Wales. The last was in his last international on 6 March 1905, in a 3–1 away defeat in Wrexham.

Death
He died at the Royal Cancer Hospital, Milton in January 1935.

Honours
Southampton
 Southern League championship:  1898–99

Rangers
 Scottish First Division:  1899–1900, 1900–01, 1901–02
 Scottish Cup: 1903
Runner-up: 1904, 1905

See also
List of Scotland national football team captains

References

External links 

Everton career summary
Chelsea career summary
Rangers career summary

1877 births
Sportspeople from Dumbarton
Footballers from West Dunbartonshire
1935 deaths
Scottish footballers
Scotland international footballers
Southern Football League players
Scottish Football League players
English Football League players
Southampton F.C. players
Greenock Morton F.C. players
Everton F.C. players
Rangers F.C. players
Chelsea F.C. players
Glossop North End A.F.C. players
Scottish football managers
Scottish expatriate football managers
Chelsea F.C. managers
Glossop North End A.F.C. managers
MTK Budapest FC managers
Manchester United F.C. non-playing staff
Scottish Football League representative players
Association football wing halves
Association football player-managers
English Football League managers